Caleb Apochi Agada (born 31 August 1994) is a Nigerian-Canadian professional basketball player for Prometey of the Latvian-Estonian Basketball League and EuroCup. Born in Nigeria and raised in Canada, he represents the Nigerian national basketball team.  In 2020-21 he led the Israel Basketball Premier League in points per game and steals per game.

Early life
Agada was born in Lafia, Nigeria, and moved to the Canadian city of Burlington, Ontario, at the age of six.

College career
Agada played college basketball for the University of Ottawa Gee-Gees from 2012–2017.

He was awarded back-to-back national U SPORTS Defensive Player of the Year honours in 2015-16 and 2016-17. At the conference level, Agada was named an OUA First Team All-Star in three consecutive seasons from 2014 to 2017.

In the 2016–17 season, he averaged 14.9 points, 6.4 rebounds and 3.3 assists per game as a fifth-year senior, earning Second Team All-Canadian honours.

Professional career
Agada started his career at the Spanish side Prat Joventud in 2017–18 season, he averaged 14.4 points, 4.5 rebounds and 3.3 assists. He moved to the Melilla Baloncesto in the 2018–19 season, averaging 12 points, 6.4 rebounds and 2.2 assists. He also played for the Canadian side Hamilton Honey Badgers in the Canadian Elite Basketball League where he played two games for the team averaging 10 points, 7.5 rebounds and 4 assists in the 2018–19 season. In the 2019–20 season, he averaged 14.7 points, 5.3 rebounds and 3.7 assists.

On 19 May 2020, he signed with Hapoel Be'er Sheva of the Israeli Basketball Premier League. Agada averaged 15 points, 6 rebounds, 3 assists and 2 steals per game. On 26 July, he exercised his option to stay with Hapoel Beer Sheva in the 2020-21 season. On 14 September, Agada was named player of the week after contributing 25 points, eight rebounds, and six assists in a win against Maccabi Rishon LeZion. In 2020-21 he led the Israel Basketball Premier League in points per game (22.9) and steals per game (2.4).

On 24 August 2021, Agada signed with Melbourne United for the 2021–22 NBL season.

On 10 July 2022, Agada signed with Prometey of the Latvian-Estonian Basketball League and EuroCup.

National team career
Agada had been previously called up to play for a Canadian national basketball team side. He was called up to play for the Nigerian national basketball team during the 2019 FIBA Basketball World Cup qualification games, during the February 23–24, 2019 qualifying window in Lagos, he averaged 4.3 points, 4.7 rebounds and 4.3 assists. He was invited for the Nigerian 2019 FIBA Basketball World Cup preliminary squad but he didn't make the final list of players. In 2021, he represented Nigeria at the Tokyo Olympics.

References

1994 births
Living people
Basketball players at the 2020 Summer Olympics
Basketball people from Ontario
BC Prometey players
Canadian expatriate basketball people in Australia
Canadian expatriate basketball people in Israel
Canadian expatriate basketball people in Spain
Canadian men's basketball players
Canadian sportspeople of Nigerian descent
CB Prat players
Club Melilla Baloncesto players
Hamilton Honey Badgers players
Hapoel Be'er Sheva B.C. players
Idoma people
Melbourne United players
Nigerian expatriate basketball people in Israel
Nigerian expatriate basketball people in Spain
Nigerian men's basketball players
Olympic basketball players of Nigeria
Ottawa Gee-Gees
Sportspeople from Burlington, Ontario
University of Ottawa alumni